Širvintos District Municipality is a municipality in Lithuania, it is in territory of Vilnius County and its capital is Širvintos.

Geography

The territory of the municipality is 906 km². Širvintos City, 5 towns – Bagaslaviškis, Čiobiškis, Gelvonai, Kernavė, Musninkai and 485 villages are in the municipality. Forests occupy 27.7% of the whole region’s territory.

The biggest rivers of the region are Neris, Širvinta and Musė.

Heritage

In the territory of the region are Kernavė’s Historical Reservation, botanical reserves for growing cranberries in Alionys, Bartkuškis (there's an old castle) and Lygaraistis, 6 parks and 2 nature monuments (Staškiūniškiai Larch and the stone with a “devil’s footprint” in Dūdai). Also there are 50 archaeological monuments, 16 architectural monuments, 15 historical monuments and 78 art monuments, 18 manor houses with parks.

Population

According to the population census of 2001, 20,207 people live in the region: 9,545 men and 10,662 women. 7,273 people live in towns and 12,934 people live in villages. About 10% (2,019 people) declared Polish nationality.

There are 4,982 people of retirement age: 3,433 women and 1,549 men. 11,186 people are employed. 52% of all working people work in state institutions.

References

External links 
 Širvintos district municipality official page

 
Municipalities of Vilnius County
Municipalities of Lithuania